Drepananthus is a genus of flowering plants belonging to the family Annonaceae.

Its native range is Vietnam to Papuasia, Fiji.

Species:

Drepananthus acuminatus 
Drepananthus angustipetalus 
Drepananthus apoensis 
Drepananthus biovulatus 
Drepananthus carinatus 
Drepananthus cauliflorus 
Drepananthus crassipetalus 
Drepananthus deltoideus 
Drepananthus filiformis 
Drepananthus havilandii 
Drepananthus hexagynus 
Drepananthus kingii 
Drepananthus lucidus 
Drepananthus magnificus 
Drepananthus minahassae 
Drepananthus novoguineensis 
Drepananthus obtusifolius 
Drepananthus olivaceus 
Drepananthus pahangensis 
Drepananthus petiolatus 
Drepananthus polycarpus 
Drepananthus prunifer 
Drepananthus pubescens 
Drepananthus ramuliflorus 
Drepananthus ridleyi 
Drepananthus samarensis 
Drepananthus vitiensis

References

Annonaceae
Annonaceae genera